Karnal Assembly Constituency is a part of Karnal district. It is one of the nine seats which make up Karnal (Lok Sabha constituency).

Members of Legislative Assembly
1957: Arjun Arora, Indian National Congress
1962: Sardar Madho Singh, Communist Party of India
1967: Ram Lal, Bharatiya Jana Sangh
1968: Shanti Prasad, Independent
1972: Ram Lal, Bharatiya Jana Sangh
1977: Ram Lal, Janata Party
1982: Shanti Devi, Indian National Congress
1987: Lachhman Dass, Bharatiya Janata Party
1991: Jai Parkash, Indian National Congress
1996: Shashipal Mehta, Bharatiya Janata Party
2000: Jai Parkash, Independent
2005: Sumita Singh, Indian National Congress
2009: Sumita Singh, Indian National Congress
2014: Manohar Lal, Bharatiya Janata Party
2019: Manohar Lal, Bharatiya Janata Party

Election results

2019

2014 Vidhan Sabha

References

Assembly constituencies of Haryana
Karnal district